Petra (German: Mord in Genua – Ein Fall für Petra Delicato) is an Italian four-part television crime series, which premiered on September 14, 2020, on Sky Italia. It is based on four detective novels by Spanish writer, Alicia Giménez Bartlett, featuring the character, Petra Delicado. The TV series was directed by Maria Sole Tognazzi. The main protagonist, Petra Delicato (Paola Cortellesi) is an Inspector for the Genoa police, originally working as an archivist. She is assisted by Deputy Inspector Antonio Monte (Andrea Pennacchi). The series was broadcast in Germany as Mord in Genua – Ein Fall für Petra Delicato from December 6, 2020, in Australia via SBS OnDemand streaming service, and in the United States on MHz Choice from November 2022.

Cast 

 Paola Cortellesi as Petra Delicato, former Rome-based lawyer, Genoan police Inspector in the archive department, called to attend a rape case due to staff shortage, appointed to the homicide squad
  as Antonio Monte, Deputy Inspector from the fraud squad, called to assist Petra, appointed to the homicide squad
  as Nicola Ferzicantieri, high-price lawyer, Rome-based, Petra's first husband, dismissive and misogynistic
  as Lorenzo, chef restaurateur, Petra's second husband, supportive but clingy
  as Pessone, Homicide Inspector, gives Petra his low profile cases
  as Salvo Carona, Superintendent, Petra's boss, tries to side-line her whenever cases turn high-profile
 Matteo Sintucci as Matteo Reva, detective, guards Petra
 Alice Acruri as Alba, Petra's housemaid, has a young son, becomes Matteo's love interest
 Beatrice Aiello as Amanda, Petra's younger sister, married to Roberto, mother of Pietro
 Nicoletta Robello as Iacalone, Public Prosecutor

Guest cast (one episode)
 Marina Occhionero as Salomé Frecciani, first rape victim, later murdered
 Federico Tolardo as Mirko, falsely confesses to Salomé's rape
 Iacopo Ricciotti as Alex Mescarelli, food-deliverer, serial rapist and mutilator
 Federica Rosellini as Luisa Sangenini, hardware store clerk, Alex' cousin/half-sister, lies about Alex
 Orietta Notari as Carla, Alex' mother, Luisa's aunt, lies about Alex and her ex-husband, Riccardo
 Alessia Giuliani as Valentina, dog trainer, owns a molossus dog Vulcano, Antonio's love interest
 Alessandro Tedeschi as Luca, vet, brief fling with Petra
 Andrea Bruschi as Ciro Toleta, dog breeder, organises dog fighting
 ? as Grazia Toleta, dog breeder-trainer, Ciro's wife, helps with dog fighting, owns a guard dog Zoa,
 Andrei Nova as Christian / Diddyim Ivanov, hotel construction foreman, Skoptsy Russian cult member
 Cristian Popa as Egor Zuratov, Moscow homicide detective, brief fling with Petra
 Marco Quaglia as Giovanni Imbreccia, journalist-editor of La Veglia, a Rome-based Catholic newspaper, highly influential client of Nicola
  as restaurant manager, witness recants his evidence
 Claudio Vanni as Mauro, police informer, convicted rapist
 Gianluca Tricarico as Dario, TV gossip monger, host of Linea Gossip, shot dead
 ? as Giorgia Baroi, sex worker, strangled and dumped in beach off Genoa
 Fabrizio Traversa as Simone, Rome-based sex worker, friend of Giorgia
 Federico Fazioli as Oreste di Monaldo, business man accused of money laundering

Episode guide

References 

Television shows set in Italy
2020 Italian television series debuts
2020s Italian television series
Italian crime television series